SS Fultala was a 4,155-ton steamship built for the British-India Steam Navigation Company in 1890 by William Doxford & Sons of Sunderland.

She was primarily used for the transportation of Indian indentured labourers to the colonies. She was designed to carry 12 first class and 1667 deck passengers. Details of some of these voyages are as follows:

Fultala was  scrapped in Bombay in 1923.

See also 
 Indian Indenture Ships to Fiji
 Indian indenture system

References

External links 
 
 

Ships of the British India Steam Navigation Company
Indian indenture ships to Fiji
Victorian-era passenger ships of the United Kingdom
1890 ships